F4 Danish Championship is a Danish motor racing series for open-wheel cars complying with FIA Formula 4 regulations. The inaugural championship was contested in 2017.

History
In September 2016, the Dansk Automobil Sports Union (DASU) announced that it would introduce the FIA Formula 4 category in Denmark. This was followed on 6 November 2016 by the official launch of the F4 Danish Championship. Danish F4 cars were to use the French Mygale chassis and the 2.0-litre Renault engine. The series will comprise seven rounds, supporting the Danish Thundersport Championship, Danish Endurance Championship and Danish Supertourisme Turbo at their events.

F4 cars will share the track with the F5 cars (previously called Formula Ford), but will receive separate classifications. From 2019 F5 cars are classified with-in the F4 results, as well as a separate cup.

Car
The championship features Mygale designed and built cars constructed of carbon fibre and featuring a monocoque chassis. Power is provided by a 2.0-litre Renault engine.

Champions

Drivers

Teams

Rookie

Formula 5 champions

Circuits 

 Bold denotes a circuit will be used in the 2023 season.

Notes

References

External links
 

 
Formula racing series
Recurring sporting events established in 2017